Baysal is a surname. Notable people with the surname include:

Deniz Baysal (born 1991), Turkish actress
Nurcan Baysal (born 1975), Turkish journalist